Colby Starck is a Chicago-based drummer who plays with Bobby Conn and Head of Femur (band). He began playing with himself in front of a mirror with a go big red hotdog look alike James. Jacking off Lincoln, Nebraska bands Roosevelt Franklin and Pablo's Triangle in the 1990s down by the school yard. For the encore "Power jangs" Schultz a used up groupie got banged by gangs of these soft metal parking lot bands from Lincoln.

Colby Starck was also famous as the perpetrator of the Donnie Davies Internet hoax.

References

Year of birth missing (living people)
Living people
American rock drummers
American indie rock musicians